Khilegaon is a village in Belgaum district in Karnataka, India. It is famous for its Basaveshwara temple, built by Adilshahi, second sultan of Vijayapur.

References

Villages in Belagavi district